Hakim Toumi OLY (born January 30, 1961, in Algiers, Algiers Province) is a retired male hammer thrower from Algeria.

Toumi twice represented his native country at the Summer Olympics, in 1984 and 1988.

International competitions

1Representing Africa

External links
 

1961 births
Living people
Sportspeople from Algiers
Algerian male hammer throwers
Olympic athletes of Algeria
Athletes (track and field) at the 1984 Summer Olympics
Athletes (track and field) at the 1988 Summer Olympics
World Athletics Championships athletes for Algeria
African Games gold medalists for Algeria
African Games silver medalists for Algeria
African Games medalists in athletics (track and field)
Athletes (track and field) at the 1983 Mediterranean Games
Athletes (track and field) at the 1987 Mediterranean Games
Athletes (track and field) at the 1997 Mediterranean Games
Athletes (track and field) at the 1987 All-Africa Games
Athletes (track and field) at the 1991 All-Africa Games
Athletes (track and field) at the 1995 All-Africa Games
Athletes (track and field) at the 1999 All-Africa Games
Competitors at the 1986 Goodwill Games
Mediterranean Games competitors for Algeria
21st-century Algerian people